Thomas Dumbill (23 September 1884 - 9 November 1974) was a British racewalker. He competed in the 10 km walk at the 1912 Summer Olympics.

References

1884 births
1974 deaths
British male racewalkers
Olympic athletes of Great Britain
Athletes (track and field) at the 1912 Summer Olympics